Now Deh (also known as Now Deh-e Markhāl) is a village in Molla Sara Rural District, in the Central District of Shaft County, Gilan Province, Iran. At the 2006 census, its population was 276, in 77 families.

References 

Populated places in Shaft County